Eugeen Valentin Jacobs (born 28 May 1926) is a Belgian rower. He competed at the 1952 Summer Olympics in Helsinki with the men's coxed pair where they were eliminated in the semi-final repêchage.

References

External links

1926 births
Possibly living people 
Belgian male rowers
Olympic rowers of Belgium
Rowers at the 1952 Summer Olympics
Sportspeople from Antwerp
European Rowing Championships medalists
20th-century Belgian people